Facundo Argüello and Facundo Bagnis were the defending champions but only Argüello has returned to defend his title partnering Nicolás Kicker.

Argüello and Kicker won the title, defeating Marcelo Arévalo and Sergio Galdós 4–6, 6–4, [10–6] in the final.

Seeds

Draw

References
 Main Draw
 Qualifying Draw

Sarasota Open - Doubles